Robert Jolles is a pioneer of customer-centered selling and influence training.

He is the author of several books on influencing others.

Robert Jolles is the father of Danny Jolles, a stand-up comic and actor known for his role as George on TV's Crazy Ex-Girlfriend.

Works
 Why People Don't Believe You: Building Credibility From The Inside Out (2018).
 How to Change Minds: The Art of Influence without Manipulation (2013).
 Customer Centered Selling: Sales Techniques for a New World Economy (2009).
 Mental Agility: The Path to Persuasion: Capital Ideas for Business & Personal Development (2006).
 How to Run Seminars & Workshops: Presentation Skills for Consultants, Trainers and Teachers (2005).
 The Way of the Road Warrior: Lessons in Business and Life from the Road Most Traveled (2005).
 Customer Centered Selling: Eight Steps to Success from the World's Best Sales Force (2000).

See also
 Solution selling
 Social influence

References

American non-fiction writers
Living people
Year of birth missing (living people)